John or Jon Davison may refer to:

John Davison (priest) (1777–1834), English theological writer
John Davison (theologian) (1793–1863), theologian and author of Considerations on the Poor Laws
John Robert Davison (1826–1871), English barrister and politician
John Davison (Kent cricketer) (1828–1871), English cricketer
John Davison (politician) (1870–1927), British Labour Party politician, Member of Parliament for Smethwick 1918–1926
John Clarke Davison (1875–1946), Northern Irish politician
John Davison (composer) (1930–1999), American composer
Jon Davison (film producer) (born 1949), film producer
Jon Davison (professor) (born 1949), British academic
John Davison (boxer) (born 1958), British boxer
John Davison (sport shooter) (born 1966), British sport shooter
John Davison (Canadian cricketer) (born 1970), Canadian cricketer
Jon Davison (born 1971), vocalist with the bands Glass Hammer and Yes

See also 
John Davidson (disambiguation)